The First Triumvirate was the executive body of government that replaced the Junta Grande in the United Provinces of the Río de la Plata (modern-day Argentina). It started its functions on September 23, 1811, and was replaced on October 8, 1812.

Origin 
After the defeat of the patriotic forces at the Battle of Huaqui on June 20, 1811, the already damaged prestige of the Junta Grande received a fatal blow. 

The Junta's President, Cornelio Saavedra, decided to take responsibility of the Army of the North so he left office to be personally in charge of the Army. His departure gave room to the faction that supported liberal Mariano Moreno to take advantage of his absence and try to force the dissolution of the Junta. 

A Triumvirate was chosen to wield the executive power. However, this Triumvirate was controlled by a Junta Conservadora, composed by the members of the recently dissolved Junta.

End 

The actions of its members was limited by successive struggles of power. With this government the morenistas successfully neutralized their opposition, but the internal struggles, the menace of an invasion from Brazil and the military misadventures of Manuel Belgrano in the north undermined their power.

José de San Martín, with the members of the Logia Lautaro (Lautaro Lodge) and the Sociedad Patriótica (Patriotic Society) which was formed by morenistas coincided on giving privilege to the organization of a liberation army and declaration of Independence.
It was then when the destitution of the Triumvirate members and to return to the line of action impulsed by the Society. The Lautaro Lodge, on the other hand, mobilized its troops and the Patriotic Society recurred to public petitions and mobilization of the population.

The triumvirate was then replaced by the Second Triumvirate.

Members

 Feliciano Chiclana, Juan José Paso and Manuel de Sarratea.
 Secretaries without right to vote: Bernardino Rivadavia, Julián Pérez and Vicente López y Planes.

Bibliography 

Argentine War of Independence
1811 in Argentina
1812 in Argentina
Political history of Argentina
1811 establishments in Argentina
1812 disestablishments in Argentina